The Reason Why: An Anthology of the Murderous Mind is one of Ruth Rendell's few non-fiction works. It was first published by Jonathan Cape, London in 1995 and a US edition from Crown, New York followed in 1996. 

The book describes more than 100 murders organized into eight chapters according to motive. A reviewer for Publishers Weekly criticized the book for being "too neat", saying the brief descriptions of true crimes  "provide neither a serious analytical approach nor a rich imaginative one."

References

1995 books
Books by Ruth Rendell
Non-fiction crime books
Books about murder